Azure Lake may mean:

Lakes
Azure Lake, a lake in east-central British Columbia
Azure Lake (Idaho), a glacial lake in Elmore County, Idaho
Azure Lake (Whatcom County, Washington), a lake in North Cascades National Park
Azure Lake, a 2 player competition game zone in Sonic the Hedgehog 3